Aksel Johannes Skramstad Rykkvin (born 11 April 2003) is a Norwegian singer. He rose to fame as a boy soprano singing baroque arias, and recorded two albums on Signum Records with orchestral accompaniment. Critics have noted his fine vocal tone and instinctive musicality.

After his voice changed he started performing as a baritone.

Biography 
Rykkvin began singing in the Oslo Cathedral Boys' Choir, and continued as a member throughout his soprano career. At age ten he joined the Children's Chorus of the Norwegian National Opera and Ballet. As a member of the Oslo Cathedral Boys' Choir, he received vocal training beginning at the age of five from the voice teacher Helene Haarr.  At age ten he studied voice with Marianne Willumsen Lewis, as his  principal teacher. Since 2019, he has studied with the voice teacher Matthew Mark Marriott.

Rykkvin has a fine reputation internationally, both for the album Aksel! (2016) and for solo concerts. He was nominated for newcomer of the year at the 2016 Spellemannprisen for Arias By Bach, Händel & Mozart. In January 2017 he was named "The Musician of the Year" during the national part of the Youth Music Championship 2016-2017. In addition to performing in operas he sang with the Oslo Philharmonic orchestra, and has also performed for the Prime Minister and Norwegian royal family.

Recordings
His first album was funded with a Kickstarter campaign, raising nearly $45,000. It was recorded in London in January 2016 with the Orchestra of the Age of Enlightenment and conductor Nigel Short.

His second album, Light Divine, features the Norwegian Min Ensemble led by trumpeter Mark Bennett, and baroque music by Handel, Albinoni and Rameau. His voice changed a month after the recording and he then stopped performing as a soprano.

His first two albums both debuted in the Top 10 in the UK Classical Music charts.

Discography 
 2016: Aksel! - Arias by Bach, Handel & Mozart
 2018: Light Divine

References

External links 
 
 Akesel Rykkvin (Boy Soprano) at Bach Cantatas Website
 Video: 12-year-old Aksel Rykkvin sings Bach, Handel and Mozart with the OAE at Gramophone Magazine
 Matthew Mark Marriott teacher website https://sites.google.com/view/matthewmarkmarriott/frontpage

2003 births
Living people
21st-century Norwegian male opera singers
Boy sopranos
Norwegian baritones
Norwegian performers of early music
Norwegian child singers